Kurt Lipstein QC (19 March 1909 – 2 December 2006) was a German-born legal scholar. Of Jewish descent, Lipstein emigrated after the Machtergreifung. Lipstein was a renowned specialist in Roman law and conflict of laws within private international law and public international law and pioneer in comparative law.

Born in Frankfurt am Main, Lipstein earned his Abitur from Goethe-Gymnasium in 1927. He enrolled at the University of Grenoble, and later finished his studies at the University of Berlin. Among his academic advisors were Martin Wolff, Ernst Rabel, and Ernst von Caemmerer. In 1934 he emigrated to the United Kingdom, and earned his doctorate at Clare College, Cambridge in 1936. His parents perished in the Theresienstadt concentration camp.

After World War II, in which he spent some time in an internment camp as an enemy alien, he became a fellow at Clare College, and served as Professor of Comparative Law at the University of Cambridge 1973–1976.

He married, in 1944, Gwyneth Herford; she was later a city councillor in Cambridge from 1971-87, first for the Labour Party and then for the SDP, representing Newnham ward.

Further reading

External links
"Conversations with Kurt Lipstein" at Soundcloud (University of Cambridge)

1909 births
2006 deaths
Jurists from Frankfurt
Professors of Law (Cambridge, 1973)
20th-century King's Counsel
Alumni of Clare College, Cambridge
British barristers
Grenoble Alpes University alumni
Humboldt University of Berlin alumni
Jewish emigrants from Nazi Germany to the United Kingdom